Beša is a village and municipality in the Levice District in the Nitra Region of south-west Slovakia.

Genealogical resources

The records for genealogical research are available at the state archive "Statny Archiv" in Nitra, Slovakia.

 Roman Catholic church records (births/marriages/deaths): 1733-1895 (parish A)
 Reformatted church records (births/marriages/deaths): 1784-1895 (parish B)

See also
 List of municipalities and towns in Slovakia

External links

Surnames of living people in Besa

Villages and municipalities in Levice District